Bat Yam ( or  ) is a city located on Israel's Mediterranean Sea coast, on the Central Coastal Plain just south of Tel Aviv. It is part of the Gush Dan metropolitan area and the Tel Aviv District. In 2020, it had a population of 160,000.

History

British Mandate 
Bat Yam, originally Bayit VeGan (“House and Garden”), was founded in 1919 by the Bayit VeGan homeowners association, affiliated with the Mizrachi movement. The association was formed to establish a religious garden suburb in Jaffa. By March 1920, it had 400 members. In 1921,  of land were purchased, of which 1,400 were formally registered by 1923. In September 1924, an urban blueprint was approved by the association.  In early 1926, the plots were divided up and a lottery was held to determine who would build first. By October 1926, roads and water supply were complete. Six families settled on the land in cabins. According to a report in 1927, ten houses were under construction. A synagogue was dedicated in October 1928. By then there were 13 families living in Bat Yam and a total of 20 houses.
 
In the wake of the 1929 Arab riots, the residents were evacuated by the British army and their homes were turned into barracks. The soldiers left at the end of 1931. In 1932, the residents began to return and were joined by others. In November 1933, 85 families were living in the neighborhood. By early 1936, there were 300 homes and a population of 140. Local industry began to develop, a movie theatre opened and a hotel was established. The first school, named after Tachkemoni, was founded in 1936. The first headmaster was Haim Baruch Friedman.
 
In December 1936, Bayit VeGan was declared a local council. It encompassed 3,500 dunams, 370 dunams of which were Arab-owned. In December 1937, the name was formally changed to Bat Yam (literally “daughter of the sea”). By 1945, 2,000 Jews were living in Bat Yam.  In 1936–1939, the town was cut off from Tel Aviv because the road ran through Jaffa, leading to the construction of a new road via Holon. According to the Jewish National Fund, the population had risen to 4,000 by 1947.

Following the vote in favor of the United Nations Partition Plan for Palestine on November 29, 1947, and the fighting that accompanied the 1947–1948 Civil War in Mandatory Palestine, violent incidents, including sniping, were reported by the residents of Bat Yam.

State of Israel
After the establishment of the state in 1948, Bat Yam grew dramatically due to mass immigration. It gained city status in 1958.

Demography
A small Hasidic enclave of Bobover Hasidim, known as Kiryat Bobov, was established in 1958.

The vast majority of Israelis of Vietnamese origin live in Bat Yam.

Main neighborhoods

Ramat Yosef 
Named after Yosef Sprinzak, and is one of the oldest in Bat Yam, with most of its houses built in the fifties and sixties.

Shikkun Amidar 
A religious-traditional neighborhood. In the southwest part of the neighborhood,  the Defenders' Square is located, being the main commercial center of the neighborhood and of the entire city.

Kiryat Bobov 
An ultra-orthodox-Chassidic neighborhood of the Bobover Hasidism, led by Rabbi Meizlish, brother-in-law of the Rebbe of Bobov. In the neighborhood there is a synagogue, a Talmud Torah, a small yeshiva, a large yeshiva - all in one building; as well as the largest Mikveh in Bat Yam..

Orot HaTorah 
Mainly home to   - a religious Zionist community led by Rabbi David Chai HaCohen, among the institutions of the Orot HaTorah Congregation in the neighborhood: the synagogue, the high yeshiva "Yishiva Nativot Yisrael" and Talmud Torah Orot HaTorah.

Chabad 
Home to the Chabad Community - the community has five synagogues, a central Chabad house, a boys' kindergarten, a girls' kindergarten, Talmud Torah, a seminary for women and girls and a  Mikveh.

Main sites

The Defenders' Square 
A monument in the memory of the defenders of the city who fell in battle. Located at the entrance to Bat Yam from Tel Aviv. In the War of Independence, there was a defense post in this place called "Hashdera" or "King George's Position" (the previous name of the Independence Boulevard).

HaSela (the Rock) Beach 
A popular beach, surrounded by a breakwater, suitable for all ages. The beach is very active and sports activities are held there in the early morning hours. In the summer season there are summer events such as street stalls, clowns and shows.

The Bat Yam Heritage Museum 
The museum is located in the municipal library building. The museum has photographs, documents and various exhibits on the history of Bat Yam in the years 1926-1948, including a detailed description of the city's standing in the War of Independence.

The Bat Yam City Hall 
 was designed by the architects Zvi Hecker,  and Alfred Neumann. When it was built between 1960-1963, the building stood alone in the heart of the dunes and was exposed to the coastline of Bat-Yam. The building was designed in the form of an inverted pyramid, in Brutalist architecture style.

Local government 
In the early 2000s, after financial scandals under the leadership of Yehoshua Sagi, the city was on  the brink of bankruptcy. In 2003, he was replaced by Shlomo Lahiani, founder of the 
Bat Yam Berosh Muram (Bat Yam Heads-Up) party. In 2008, he was re-elected with 86% of the vote. In 2014, Lahiani pleaded guilty to three counts of breach of public trust after being charged with bribery and income tax fraud.
He was replaced by Yossi Bachar.

In 2014, after the Bat Yam municipality petitioned the  Israeli Supreme Court, Interior Minister Gideon Saar appointed a steering committee to explore the possibility of incorporating the city as part of Tel Aviv-Yafo as a way of reviving its stagnant economy. Later that year, when Gideon Sa’ar was replaced by Gilad Erdan, a decision was reached to transfer funding to Bat Yam directly from the state budget. The plan for unification was postponed until the next municipal elections in 2023. In 2019, Bat Yam's current mayor, Tzvika Brot, said he opposed the union with Tel Aviv.

Council heads and mayors

Urban development

In 2016, the municipality approved an urban renewal plan in the Ramat Hanasi neighborhood, adding 950 high-end apartments.

According to Bat Yam mayor Tzvika Brot, the city is looking for creative solutions to rebuild the city and preserve its economic independence. The city has six beaches and a 3.2 kilometer (2 mile) long promenade along the Mediterranean coast that connects to the Tel Aviv boardwalk.

According to a report in Ynet, Bat Yam has become a countrywide leader in urban renewal. Many of the city's older buildings are undergoing construction to strengthen their foundations, add floors and improve their appearance, and dozens of parks are being beautified and made accessible to visitors with disabilities.

According to Israel Central Bureau of Statistics, residents of Bat Yam have the lowest income among the largest cities in Israel.

Health care
The Yehuda Abarbanel Mental Health Center is a psychiatric hospital founded in 1944 by the British Mandate authorities. Since the establishment of the state, it had been administered by the Israeli Ministry of Health. The hospital, named for Judah Abravanel, a Portuguese rabbi, Jewish philosopher and physician in the Middle Ages, provides hospitalization and ambulatory services to residents of Tel Aviv, Jaffa, Holon and Bat Yam coping with mental illness.

Education

In 2008, the Weitzman-Albert Education Initiative headed by Jane Gershon, wife of fashion shoe designer Stuart Weitzman invested over $2 million in Bat Yam's Harel Elementary School, which received a top Education Ministry award for academic achievement and immigrant integration.

In 2017, the percentage of high school students eligible for a bagrut matriculation certificate reached 86.3%, compared to the 68.2% national average. The number of high school students doing a five-point exam in mathematics is also on the rise thanks to a program inaugurated in 2015 in cooperation with the Donald J. Trump Foundation and Alliance Israélite Universelle to encourage excellence in math.

Art and culture

In the heart of Bat Yam is a three-museum complex known as MoBY. The main building, David Ben-Ari Museum for Contemporary art was established in 1961. The Rybak House and the Sholem Asch Museum house MoBY’s permanent collections and offer educational programs. The Bat Yam Heritage Museum is adjacent to the municipal library,

The Bat Yam amphitheatre,  also built in the 1960s near the beach, is a venue for concerts and public events. The International Street Theater Festival, the largest open-space performance art celebration in Israel, is an annual summer event in Bat Yam.

The Ryback House showcases the work of Issachar Ber Ryback. The Yiddish writer Sholom Asch, who lived in Bat Yam in his later years, willed his home to the Bat Yam municipality, which turned it into museum.

In 2008 the Bat-Yam International Biennale of Landscape Urbanism, which is devoted to re-examining urban spaces through art and architecture, was held in Bat Yam. In 2010, the second Biennale, "Timing" took place, which featured site-specific installations from designers and architects from around the world.

The Center for Urbanism and Mediterranean Culture is a research institute devoted to the creation of a new discourse in Israeli urban space. The head of the center is veteran Haaretz correspondent Avirama Golan.

The city has two shopping malls, Kanyon Bat Yam, which opened in 1993, and Kanyon Bat Yamon.

Archaeology
In September 2011, an iron anchor dating to the Byzantine period was discovered off the coast of Bat Yam. According to the Israel Antiquities Authority, it was likely that of a  boat that sank in a storm about 1,700 years ago and may be proof of an unknown ancient harbor on the coast.

Architecture
Bat Yam’s old city hall, designed by Israeli architect Zvi Hecker in the 1960s,  is a modernist building of reinforced concrete in the shape of an inverted ziggurat. The design was chosen in a competition in 1959 which drew entries from the leading architectural firms in Israel.

Beaches

The location of Bat Yam on the Mediterranean makes it popular with beach-goers. The city has six beaches, one of which is protected by a breakwater.

Bat Yam's Al Gal beach is a popular surfing spot with fairly consistent surf conditions, especially during the summer months. Both Al Gal and Hagolshim are straight, exposed dune-backed beaches.

Transportation
Two stations opened in the city in 2011 as part of the new Tel Aviv – Rishon LeZion West line: Bat Yam-Yoseftal Railway Station and Bat Yam-Komemiyut Railway Station.
Bat Yam will be served by several new stations on both the Red Line of the Tel Aviv Light Rail and the Metro line M3. The city will be the terminus for both lines and the lines will meet at the new Yoseftal Station.

The city will be served by the Ayalon Route of the Ofnidan bike path network.

Sports
The city's major football (soccer) club, Beitar Tel Aviv Bat Yam, currently plays in Liga Leumit, the second level of Israeli football.

International relations

Bat Yam is twinned with:

 Antalya, Turkey
 Edirne, Turkey
 Aurich (district), Germany
 Kostroma, Russia
 Kragujevac, Serbia
 Kutno, Poland
 Livorno, Italy
 Neukölln (Berlin), Germany
 Valparaíso, Chile
 Villeurbanne, France
 Vinnytsia, Ukraine
 Manhattan, United States

Notable people

Shay Abutbul (born 1983), soccer player
Michael Barkai (1935–1999), Commander of the Israeli Navy
Miri Ben-Ari (born 1978), hip hop violinist
Moshe Biton, soccer player
Vered "Vardush" Buskila (born 1983), Olympic sailor
Tomer Chencinski (born 1984), Israeli–Canadian soccer player
Eli Cohen (1924–1965), Israeli spy
Meir Dagan (born 1945), Director of the Mossad
David D'Or (born 1965), singer, composer, and songwriter
Elana Eden (born 1940), actress
Sharon Farber, composer
Haim Gozali, mixed martial arts fighter
Matt Haimovitz (born 1970), US cellist
Henryk Hechtkopf (1910–2004), illustrator
Rita Katz (born 1963), terrorism analyst
Gili Landau (born 1958), footballer and manager
Achinoam Nini (born 1969), singer
Peter Roth (born 1974), pop singer and composer
Gal Shish (born 1989), soccer player
Itzik Zohar (born 1970), soccer player

References

External links

Official website 
Reconstructing urban image through cultural flagship events: The case of Bat-Yam

 
1926 establishments in Mandatory Palestine
1929 Palestine riots
Cities in Tel Aviv District
Jewish villages in Mandatory Palestine
Populated coastal places in Israel
Populated places established in 1926